is a monorail train station on the Shōnan Monorail Enoshima Line located in Fujisawa, Kanagawa Prefecture, Japan. It is located 6.2 kilometers from the northern terminus of the Shōnan Monorail Enoshima Line at Ōfuna Station.

History
Mejiroyamashita Station was opened on July 1, 1971 as part of the second phase of construction of the line, which extended its terminus to Shōnan-Enoshima Station.

Lines
Shōnan Monorail Company Ltd
Enoshima Line

Station layout
Mejiroyamashita Station is an elevated station with single island platform serving two tracks. The station is unattended.

Adjacent stations

External links
Shonan Monorail home page 

Railway stations in Kanagawa Prefecture
Railway stations in Japan opened in 1971
Shonan Monorail Enoshima Line
Railway stations in Fujisawa, Kanagawa
Stations of Shonan Monorail